

Ordbriht was a monk at Glastonbury, Winchester, and then Abingdon until 964 when he was appointed Abbot of Chertsey by Æthelwold; Ordbriht attests as Bishop of Selsey from about 989 to 1007 or 1008.

Ordbriht became bishop of Selsey between 988 and 990 and he died between 1007 and 1009.

Citations

References

External links
 

Abbots of Chertsey
Bishops of Selsey
10th-century English bishops
11th-century English Roman Catholic bishops
1009 deaths
Year of birth unknown